Tritonia is a genus of sea slugs, nudibranchs, shell-less marine gastropod molluscs in the family Tritoniidae.

Tritonia is the type genus of the family Tritoniidae.

Species
Species within the genus Tritonia include:
 The type species is Tritonia hombergii Cuvier, 1803

 Tritonia antarctica Pfeffer in Martens & Pfeffer, 1886
 Tritonia australis (Bergh, 1898)
 Tritonia bollandi Smith & Gosliner, 2003
 Tritonia callogorgiae Chimienti, Furfaro & Taviani, 2020
 Tritonia challengeriana Bergh, 1884 - synonyms:Tritonia appendiculata (Eliot, 1905)
 Tritonia coralliumrubri Doneddu, Sacco & Trainito, 2014
 Tritonia dantarti Ballesteros & Avila 2006
 Tritonia episcopalis Bouchet, 1977
 Tritonia exsulans Bergh, 1894
 Tritonia festiva (Stearns, 1873)
Tritonia flemingi (Powell, 1937)
Tritonia griegi Odhner, 1922
Tritonia hirondelle Ortea & Moro, 2020
Tritonia hombergii Cuvier, 1803
Tritonia incerta Bergh, 1904
Tritonia indecora Bergh, 1907
Tritonia ingolfiana (Bergh, 1899)
Tritonia newfoundlandica Valdés, Murillo, McCarthy & Yedinak, 2017
Tritonia odhneri Er. Marcus, 1959
Tritonia olivacea Bergh, 1905
Tritonia pallescens Eliot, 1906
Tritonia pallida Stimpson, 1855
Tritonia poirieri (Mabille & Rochebrune, 1891)
Tritonia primorjensis Minichev, 1971
Tritonia psoloides (Aurivillius, 1887)
Tritonia sp. 1 soft coral nudibranch
Tritonia sp. 2 brush nudibranch 
Tritonia tetraquetra (Pallas, 1788)
Tritonia vorax (Odhner, 1926)

Synonyms:

 Tritonia acuminata Costa A., 1840: synonym of Marionia blainvillea (Risso, 1818)
 Tritonia alba Alder & Hancock, 1854: synonym of Tritonia hombergii Cuvier, 1803
 Tritonia appendiculata Eliot, 1905: synonym of Tritonia challengeriana Bergh, 1884
 Tritonia ascanii Møller, 1842: synonym of Dendronotus frondosus (Ascanius, 1774)
 Tritonia atrofusca MacGillivray, 1843: synonym of Tritonia hombergii Cuvier, 1803
 Tritonia aurantiaca (Barnard, 1927): accepted as Duvaucelia plebeia (G. Johnston, 1828)
 Tritonia aurantiacum [sic]: synonym of Tritonia aurantiaca (Barnard, 1927) accepted as Tritonia plebeia G. Johnston, 1828
 Tritonia bayeri Ev. Marcus & Er. Marcus, 1967: synonym of Tritonicula bayeri (Ev. Marcus & Er. Marcus, 1967)
 Tritonia blainvillea Risso, 1818: synonym of Marionia blainvillea (Risso, 1818)
 Tritonia cincta Pruvot-Fol, 1937: synonym of Tritoniopsis cincta (Pruvot-Fol, 1937)
 Tritonia conifera Dalyell, 1853: synonym of Tritonia hombergii Cuvier, 1803 (dubious synonym)
 Tritonia costae Vérany, 1846: synonym of Marionia blainvillea (Risso, 1818)
 Tritonia cucullata Couthouy in Gould, 1852: synonym of Marionia cucullata (Couthouy, 1852) (original combination)
 Tritonia cyanobranchiata Rüppell & Leuckart, 1828: synonym of Marionia cyanobranchiata (Rüppell & Leuckart, 1828) (original combination)
 Tritonia decaphylla Cantraine, 1835: synonym of Marionia blainvillea (Risso, 1818)
 Tritonia diomedea Bergh, 1894: synonym of Tritonia tetraquetra (Pallas, 1788)
 Tritonia divaricata Dalyell, 1853: synonym of Tritonia hombergii Cuvier, 1803
 Tritonia elegans Audouin, 1826: synonym of Tritoniopsis elegans (Audouin, 1826) (original combination)
 Tritonia eriosi Ev. Marcus, 1983: synonym of Tritonia odhneri Er. Marcus, 1959
 Tritonia felina Alder & Hancock, 1842: synonym of Dendronotus frondosus (Ascanius, 1774)
 Tritonia gibbosa Risso, 1818: synonym of Ancula gibbosa (Risso, 1818) (original combination)
 Tritonia gigantea Bergh, 1904: synonym of Tochuina gigantea (Bergh, 1904) (original combination)
 Tritonia glama Rüppell & Leuckart, 1828: synonym of Marionia glama (Rüppell & Leuckart, 1828) (original combination)
 Tritonia gracilis (Risso, 1826): synonym of Duvaucelia manicata Deshayes, 1853
 Tritonia hamnerorum Gosliner & Ghiselin, 1987: synonym of Tritonicula hamnerorum (Gosliner & Ghiselin, 1987)
 Tritonia hombergi [sic]: synonym of Tritonia hombergii Cuvier, 1803 (misspelling)
 Tritonia khaleesi F. V. Silva, Azevedo & Matthews-Cascon, 2014: synonym of Marianina khaleesi (Silva, de Azevedo et Matthews-Cascon, 2014)
 Tritonia lactea W. Thompson, 1840: synonym of Dendronotus lacteus (W. Thompson, 1840) (original combination)
 Tritonia lineata Alder & Hancock, 1848: synonym of Duvaucelia lineata (Alder & Hancock, 1848)
 Tritonia manicata Deshayes, 1853: synonym of Duvaucelia manicata (Deshayes, 1853)
 Tritonia meyeri Vérany, 1862: synonym of Marionia blainvillea (Risso, 1818)
 Tritonia moesta Bergh, 1884: synonym of Duvaucelia manicata Deshayes, 1853
 Tritonia myrakeenae Bertsch & Mozqueira, 1986: synonym of Tritonicula myrakeenae (Bertsch & Osuna, 1986)
 Tritonia nigritigris Valdés, Lundsten & N. G. Wilson, 2018: synonym of Tochuina nigritigris (Valdés, Lundsten & Wilson, 2018)
 Tritonia nigromaculata Roginskaya, 1984: synonym of Tochuina nigromaculata (Roginskaya, 1984)
 Tritonia nilsodhneri Marcus Ev., 1983: synonym of Duvaucelia odhneri J. Tardy, 1963
 Tritonia papalotla Bertsch, Valdés & Gosliner, 2009: synonym of Trivettea papalotla (Bertsch, Valdés & Gosliner, 2009) (original combination)
 Tritonia pickensi Ev. Marcus & Er. Marcus, 1967: synonym of Tritonicula pickensi (Ev. Marcus & Er. Marcus, 1967)
 Tritonia plebeia G. Johnston, 1828: synonym of Duvaucelia plebeia (G. Johnston, 1828)
 Tritonia pulchella Alder & Hancock, 1842: synonym of Dendronotus frondosus (Ascanius, 1774)
 Tritonia pulchra G. Johnston, 1828: synonym of Duvaucelia plebeia (G. Johnston, 1828)
 Tritonia pustulosa Deshayes, 1853: synonym of Tritonia hombergii Cuvier, 1803
 Tritonia quadrilatera Philippi, 1844: synonym of Marionia blainvillea (Risso, 1818)
 Tritonia reticulata Bergh, 1882: synonym of Tritonia festiva (Stearns, 1873)
 Tritonia reynoldsii Couthouy, 1838: synonym of Dendronotus frondosus (Ascanius, 1774) (dubious synonym)
 Tritonia rubra Rüppell & Leuckart, 1828: synonym of Marionia rubra (Rüppell & Leuckart, 1828) (original combination)
 Tritonia striata Haefelfinger, 1963: synonym of Duvaucelia striata (Haefelfinger, 1963)
 Tritonia taliartensis Ortea & Moro, 2009: synonym of Duvaucelia taliartensis (Ortea & Moro, 2009)
 Tritonia tetraquetra (Pallas, 1788) sensu Bergh, 1879: synonym of Tochuina gigantea (Bergh, 1904)
 Tritonia thethydea Delle Chiaje, 1841: synonym of Marionia blainvillea (Risso, 1818)
 Tritonia varicosa W. Turton, 1825: synonym of Tritia varicosa (W. Turton, 1825) (original combination)
 Tritonia wellsi Er. Marcus, 1961: synonym of Tritonicula wellsi (Er. Marcus, 1961)

References

External links

Tritoniidae
Gastropod genera
Taxa named by Georges Cuvier